Darby Township is one of the fourteen townships of Madison County, Ohio, United States.  The 2000 census found 2,872 people in the township, 935 of whom lived in the unincorporated portions of the township.

Geography
Located in the northeastern corner of the county, it borders the following townships:
Darby Township, Union County - north
Jerome Township, Union County - northeast
Washington Township, Franklin County - east
Canaan Township - south
Monroe Township - southwest
Pike Township - west

Part of the village of Plain City is located in northeastern Darby Township.

Name and history
As of 1854, the population of the township was 551, 1,504 in 1890, 1,558 in 1900, and 1,414 in 1910.  Statewide, other Darby Townships are located in Pickaway and Union counties.

Government
The township is governed by a three-member board of trustees, who are elected in November of odd-numbered years to a four-year term beginning on the following January 1. Two are elected in the year after the presidential election and one is elected in the year before it. There is also an elected township fiscal officer, who serves a four-year term beginning on April 1 of the year after the election, which is held in November of the year before the presidential election. Vacancies in the fiscal officership or on the board of trustees are filled by the remaining trustees.

References

External links
County website

Townships in Madison County, Ohio
Townships in Ohio